George Wartman Carman   (March 29, 1866 – June 16, 1929) was a Major League Baseball shortstop.

External links

Major League Baseball shortstops
Philadelphia Athletics (AA) players
Baseball players from Pennsylvania
1866 births
1929 deaths
Shamokin Maroons players
Reading (minor league baseball) players
Easton (minor league baseball) players
Harrisburg Ponies players
Lebanon Pretzel Eaters players
Minor league baseball managers
19th-century baseball players